Ferenc Csipes (born 8 March 1965 in Budapest) is a Hungarian sprint canoeist who competed from 1985 to 1996. Competing in three Summer Olympics, he won four medals with one gold (1988: K-4 1000 m), two silvers (1992, 1996: both K-4 1000 m), and one bronze (1988: K-2 500 m).

Csipes also won sixteen ICF Canoe Sprint World Championships medals with eight golds (K-1 1000 m: 1985, K-1 10000 m: 1986, K-2 500 m: 1987, K-4 1000 m: 1986, 1987, 1989, 1990, 1991), four silvers (K-1 1000 m: 1986, 1987, 1991; K-4 10000 m: 1989), and four bronzes (K-2 500 m: 1991, K-4 500 m: 1990, 1994; K-2 10000 m: 1987).

Awards
 Hungarian kayaker of the Year (4): 1985, 1986, 1987, 1991
 Order of Merit of the Hungarian People's Republic – Order of Stars (1988)
   Cross of Merit of the Republic of Hungary – Golden Cross (1992)
   Order of Merit of the Republic of Hungary – Small Cross (1996)
 Hungarian Coach of the Year (1) - votes of sports journalists: 2011
   Order of Merit of Hungary – Officer's Cross (2012)
 Papp László Budapest Sport awards (2012)
   Order of Merit of Hungary – Commander's Cross (2016)

References

External links
 
 

1965 births
Canoeists at the 1988 Summer Olympics
Canoeists at the 1992 Summer Olympics
Canoeists at the 1996 Summer Olympics
Hungarian male canoeists
Living people
Olympic canoeists of Hungary
Olympic gold medalists for Hungary
Olympic silver medalists for Hungary
Olympic bronze medalists for Hungary
Canoeists from Budapest
Olympic medalists in canoeing
ICF Canoe Sprint World Championships medalists in kayak
Medalists at the 1996 Summer Olympics
Medalists at the 1992 Summer Olympics
Medalists at the 1988 Summer Olympics
20th-century Hungarian people